The Philippine Collegian is the official weekly student publication of the University of the Philippines Diliman. It is also commonly known to the university's students as Kulê. It is known for its radical, national democratic, often anti-administration views, and gives critical views on the policies of the UP administration and the Philippine government.

History
First known as the College Folio (1910) and Varsity News (1917). As the College Folio, it was one of the first undergraduate journals in the Philippines. The Philippine Collegian was officially established in 1922. Since then, it has become a symbol for academic freedom, critical thinking, and journalistic integrity and excellence. In 1935, the Collegian published Teodoro Agoncillo's review of Ricardo Pascual's book Dr. Jose Rizal beyond the Grave, despite threats of excommunication from the Catholic Church. And in 1951, editor in chief (EIC) Elmer Ordoñez exposed the government's intervention in UP affairs, particularly in the aftermath of UP President Bienvenido Gonzalez's resignation. That period also saw the accommodation of the Filipino language in its content. During the post-war years, the Collegian became increasingly progressive in tackling university-based issues, particularly on “sectarianism” and favoritism in the administration. Despite the widespread conservatism, which equated nationalist sentiments with “communist threats,” the Collegian continued publishing articles from socialism to the Hukbalahap movement.

During the Japanese Occupation, the Collegian was largely silent, since many of the university's units were shut down. In 1946, the Collegian resumed publishing, maintaining an anti-colonialist perspective.
The 1950s brought to fore issues of academic freedom in the university, heightening the clash of beliefs between the Collegian, the university administration, and the national government. Then EIC Homobono Adaza, for example, was expelled for an editorial criticizing the UP administration.

Articles on the emergent revolutionary movement gained ground in the 1960s, complementing the rise of the student movement against the dictatorship of then President Ferdinand Marcos. During Martial Law, the Collegian defied the media blackout by going underground. The publication formed the radical press together with the other student publications such as the Ang Malaya of the Philippine College of Commerce, now Polytechnic University of the Philippines and Pandayan of Ateneo de Manila University and the publications of various national democratic groups. By the time Martial Law as declared in 1972, the Collegian's nationalist orientation was already established. The publication continued to operate underground, exposing realities that were vastly different from what was presented by government-controlled media. Subsequently, several Collegian staff, including Enrique Voltaire Garcia and Antonio Tagamolila, faced imprisonment and death. While the regular Collegian headed by EIC Oscar Yabes in 1973 headlined UP President Salvador P. Lopez's campus beautification project and weekly UAAP updates, the Rebel Collegian decried the 20-percent tuition hike and the dissolution of student institutions like the Office of Student Regent and the UP Student Council. The Rebel Collegian issues brought to the fore the students' demand for lower tuition and dorm rates, among others, while "taking up the oppressed masses cause in exposing the corruption, servility, and violence of our semi-colonial and semi-feudal society." Meanwhile, the regular Collegian of then EIC Oscar Yabes served as a diversionary propaganda tool with its emphasis on counter-revolutionary literary pieces, with nary a critique of the atrocities under the US-Marcos regime. Yabes would also later come under fire due to his alleged malversation of the newspaper's funds.

The paper remained vigilant even after the collapse of the Marcos regime. In the 1989 editorial “EDSA and UP—Three Years After,” EIC Ruben Carranza, Jr. noted that “social injustice and foreign domination” remained entrenched in Philippine society. In the euphoria following the end of People Power, this viewpoint was decidedly unpopular.

The conflicts experienced by the Collegian, however, were not entirely external. Power struggles and challenges in editorship roused many controversies in the past. For instance, the Rebel Collegian came into existence in 1996 after the battle between Voltaire Veneracion and Richard Gappi, rivals for the EIC post that year. The UP community saw two contending Collegians—Gappi's Rebel Collegian and the regular Collegian under Veneracion. The articles in the Rebel Collegian in 1996 bore no byline, although it was an open secret that Gappi led the publication's operations. The newsprint became an arena of the opposing camps from the ideological rift that characterized the Left movement then. On the one hand, Veneracion and the editor before him, Ibarra Gutierrez, espoused social democratic politics, Gappi and most of his colleagues from former EIC Michael John Ac-Ac's staff embraced national democracy. The 1980s and 1990s spurred additional internal disputes as staffers and editors fought to assert competing philosophies.

At the height of the campaign against the 300 percent tuition hike, then UP President Emerlinda Roman insisted on a public bidding for the Collegian's printing press, based on the administration's interpretation of Republic Act 9184 or the Government Procurement Act, and thus withheld funds for four months—the publication's longest hiatus since World War II.

In 2018, the fourth iteration of the Rebel Collegian (Rebel Kulê) was released. The controversy began when the Board of Judges of the Philippine Collegian Editorial Examinations, headed by UP College of Mass Communication Dean Elena Pernia, released the list of qualified takers but excluded two Collegian writers, Marvin Ang and Richard Cornelio, on the grounds of their graduating statuses. Law student Jayson Edward San Juan topped the four-part test and the decision was upheld despite appeals from the Collegian and student councils in UP to hold another examination. Sheila Ann Abarra, the managing editor of the past editorial term, served as Rebel Kulê's EIC.

Since the ouster of Marcos during the EDSA Revolution, the Collegian has regularly undergone changes in format and withstood controversies regarding the selection of its editors.

Collegian Editors-in-Chief

 Francisco Capistrano, 1923–1924
 Emerito M. Ramos, 1930–1931
 Wenceslao Q. Vinzons, 1931–1932
 Ambrosio Padilla, 1932–1933
 Arturo M. Tolentino, 1933–1934
 Armando de J. Malay, 1934–1935
 Romeno S. Busuego, 1937–1938
 Renato Constantino, 1939–1940
 Angel G. Baking, 1940–1941
 Delfin R. Garcia, 1941–1942
 Juan M. Hagad, 1946–1947
 Mariano V. Ampil, Jr., 1947–1948
 Leonardo B. Perez, 1948–1949
 Augusto Caesar Espiritu, 1949–1950
 Elmer A. Ordonez, 1950–1951
 Francisco D. Villanueva, 1951–1952
 Ignacio Debuque, 1952–1953
 Crispulo J. Icban, Jr., 1953–1954
 Luis Q. U. Uranza, Jr., 1954–1955
 Sabino Padilla, Jr., 1955–1956
 Homobono A. Adaza, 1956
 Jose H. Y. Masakayan, 1956–1957
 Homobono Adaza, 1957–1958
 Pacifico Agabin, 1958
 Caesar Agnir, 1958–1959
 Andres G. Gatmaitan, 1959-1960
 Leonardo Quisumbing, 1961–1962
 Angelito Imperio, 1962–1963
 Tristan Catindig, 1964
 Salvador T. Carlota, 1964
 Enrique Voltaire Garcia II, 1965
 Ancheta K. Tan, 1965
 Agustin Que, 1966
 Jaime J. Yambao, 1966
 Temario Rivera, 1967
 Nelson A. Navarro, 1967
Miriam P. Defensor, 1968
 José Y. Arcellana, 1968
 Victor H. Manarang, 1969
 Ernesto M. Valencia, 1970
 Antonio S. Tagamolila, 1970
 Reynaldo B. Vea, 1971
 Eduardo T. Gonzalez, 1971
 Teodoro D. Yabut, Jr., 1972
 Oscar G. Yabes, 1972
 Emmanuel F. Esguerra, 1974–1975
 Diwa C. Guinigundo, 1975
 Abraham Sarmiento, Jr., 1975–1976
 Cosme Diaz Rosell, 1976–1977
 Alexander Poblador, 1977–1978
 Diwata A. Reyes, 1978–1979
 Malou Mangahas, 1979–1980
 Roberto Z. Coloma, 1980–1981
 Roan I. Libarios, 1981–1982
 Napoleon J. Poblador, 1982–1983
 Raphael P. Lotilla, 1983–1984
 Benjamin Pimentel, Jr., 1984–1985
 Noel Pangilinan, 1985–1986
 Dean Karlo La Vina, 1986–1987
 Ma. Cristina Godinez, 1987–1988
 Patrocinio Jude H. Esguerra III, 1988–1989
 Ruben Carranza, Jr., 1989–1990
 Francis Ronald Perez, 1990–1991
 Alexander Pabico, 1991–1992
 Pablo John Garcia, Jr., 1992–1993
 Bernard Cobarrubias, 1993–1994
 Michael John C. Ac-ac, 1994–1995
 Ibarra M. Gutierrez, 1995–1996
 Voltaire Veneracion, 1996–1997
 Lourdes C. Gordolan, 1997–1998
 Jeanie Rose Bacong, 1998–1999
 Seymour Barros-Sanchez, 1999–2000
 Herbert V. Docena, 2000–2001
 Duke M. Bajenting, 2001–2002
 Ellaine Rose A. Beronio, 2002–2003
 Sherwin A. Mapanoo, 2003–2004
 Jayson DP. Fajarda, 2004–2005
 Juan Paolo E. Colet, 2005–2006
 Karl Fredrick M. Castro, 2006–2007
 Jerrie M. Abella, 2007–2008
 Larissa Mae R. Suarez, 2008–2009
 Om Narayan A. Velasco, 2009–2010
 Pauline Gidget R. Estella, 2010–2011
 Marjohara S. Tucay, 2011–2012
 Ma. Katherine H. Elona, 2012–2013
 Julian Inah G. Anunciacion, 2013–2014
 Mary Joy T. Capistrano, 2014–2016
 Karen Ann A. Macalalad, 2016–2017
 Sanny Boy D. Afable, 2017–2018
 Jayson Edward B. San Juan, 2018–2019
 Beatrice P. Puente, 2019–2020
 Kimberly Anne P. Yutuc, 2020–2021
 Polynne E. Dira, 2021–2022
 Daniel Sebastianne B. Daiz, 2022–present

Notable alumni
 Ambrosio Padilla, elected member of the Senate of the Philippines.
 Jose Maria Sison, scholar, revolutionary, and founder of the Communist Party of the Philippines.
 Franklin Drilon, Senate of the Philippines President.
 Miriam Defensor Santiago, first woman editor-in-chief of the Philippine Collegian; elected member of the Senate of the Philippines.
Edcel C. Lagman, eight term Representative of the First District of Albay; Author of the Reproductive Health Law, and the triumvirate of human rights laws, namely: the Anti-Enforced Disappearance Law, Anti-Torture Act, and Human Rights Victims Reparation and Recognition Act.
 Wenceslao Vinzons, student leader, former governor and representative of Camarines Norte.
 Ninotchka Rosca, author of the English language novels State of War and Twice Blessed.
 Renato Constantino, historian, author of the Filipino novels A Past Revisited and The Continuing Past.
 Leonardo Quisumbing, Associate Justice of the Supreme Court of the Philippines.
 Abraham Sarmiento, Jr., student leader.
 Reynato Puno, Supreme Court of the Philippines Chief Justice.
 Temario Rivera, Former professor of political science at the University of the Philippines Diliman; author of Landlords and Capitalists: Class, Family and State in Philippine Manufacturing.
 Sheila Coronel, journalist, founder of Philippine Center for Investigative Journalism.
 Ma. Lourdes C. Mangahas, founder of Philippine Center for Investigative Journalism.
 Michael Purugganan, Professor of Biology and Dean for Science at the New York University.
 Joker Arroyo, elected member of the Senate of the Philippines.
 Arturo Tolentino, representative, elected member of the Senate of the Philippines, Minister of Foreign Affairs, and Vice President of the Philippines.
 Benigno Aquino Jr., elected member of the Senate of the Philippines; martyr; namesake of Ninoy Aquino International Airport.
 Jovito Salonga, Senate of the Philippines President.
 Homobono Adaza, former Governor of Misamis Oriental, Assemblyman, Commissioner of Immigration; author of 12 published books and former columnist of the Manila Times.
 Pacifico Agabin, former dean of the University of the Philippines College of Law, leading constitutional lawyer.
 Emmanuel F. Esguerra, former Deputy Director-General of NEDA and a UP Professor of Economics.
 Salvador Carlota, former dean of the University of the Philippines College of Law.
 Nelson A. Navarro, leading biographer and author.
 Luis V. Teodoro, former dean of the UP College of Mass Communication, writer and author, founding chairman of Altermidya.
 Jaime C. Yambao, retired Philippine ambassador to Pakistan.
 Glenn L. Diaz, 2017 Palanca Grand Nobela Winner for The Quiet Ones.
 Kenneth Roland A. Guda, editor of progressive newspaper Pinoy Weekly.
 Joseph Thaddeus Morong, GMA Network Correspondent.
 Wendell Gumban, activist and slain New People's Army militia.

References

External links

Facebook page
Twitter page
Issuu page
Philippine Collegian 2011-2012 on DeviantArt - downloadable issues in PDF format
Philippine Collegian 2008-2009 on DeviantArt - downloadable issues in PDF format
Philippine Collegian 2007-2008 on DeviantArt - downloadable issues in PDF format
Philippine Collegian 2006-2007 on DeviantArt - downloadable issues in PDF format

Student newspapers published in Metro Manila
Newspapers established in 1910
1910 establishments in the Philippines